S. danae may refer to:
 Scinax danae, a frog species
 Sympetrum danae, the black darter, a butterfly species

See also
 Danae (disambiguation)